The Master of Merripit is a 1915 British silent film directed by Wilfred Noy and starring Dorothy Bellew.

References

Bibliography
 Low, Rachael. History of the British Film, 1914-1918. Routledge, 2005.

External links

1915 films
1915 drama films
British drama films
Films directed by Wilfred Noy
British silent feature films
British black-and-white films
1910s English-language films
1910s British films
Silent drama films